The sixray corydoras (Corydoras pauciradiatus) or false corydoras is a tropical freshwater fish belonging to the Corydoradinae sub-family of the family Callichthyidae. It originates in inland waters in South America, and is found in the upper Araguaia River basin in Brazil.

It feeds on worms, benthic crustaceans, insects, and plant matter. It lays eggs in dense vegetation and adults do not guard the eggs.

The sixray corydoras is of commercial importance in the aquarium trade industry.

See also
List of freshwater aquarium fish species

References 

Callichthyidae
Fish of South America
Fauna of Brazil
Fish of Brazil
Taxa named by Stanley Howard Weitzman
Taxa named by Han Nijssen
Fish described in 1970